Warla is a village in Barwani district in the Indian state of Madhya Pradesh. It is the headquarters of Warla tehsil.

Geography
It is a  Tehsil of Barwani district.

Transport 
The nearest airport is indore.

References

External links
 Barwani District

Villages in Barwani district
Barwani district